Championship Hockey is a 1992 ice hockey video game that was released exclusively for the European Sega Master System. A port of the game was released in 1994 for the Sega Game Gear.

Summary
Players must play international ice hockey matches against 22 of the world's most powerful ice hockey playing nations.

There is a bird's eye view that allows players to get a wider scope of the game being played. Players can choose between 5, 10, or 20-minute periods. Penalties can be enabled; with all of them netting two minutes in the penalty box. There are no major penalties or game misconducts in this video game. Players can participate in an exhibition game, a regular season-style endeavor, or through a "best of 7" playoff series.

Teams included in the game include: Belgium, Canada, Czechoslovakia, Denmark, Finland, France, Germany, Hungary, Iceland, Italy, Luxembourg, Netherlands, Norway, Poland, Portugal, Russia, Spain, Sweden, Switzerland, United Kingdom and the United States.

References

1992 video games
1994 video games
Electronic Arts games
Europe-exclusive video games
Master System games
Game Gear games
Multiplayer and single-player video games
Video games developed in the United Kingdom